The 2010 Honolulu Challenger was a professional tennis tournament played on outdoor hard courts. It was part of the 2010 ATP Challenger Tour. It took place in Honolulu, Hawaii between 25 and 31 January 2010.

ATP entrants

Seeds

 Rankings are as of January 18, 2010

Other entrants
The following players received wildcards into the singles main draw:
  Hendrik Bode
  Michael McClune
  Leo Rosenberg

The following players received entry from the qualifying draw:
  Grigor Dimitrov
  Jan-Michael Gambill
  Nikola Mektić
  Yang Tsung-hua

The following player received the lucky loser spot:
  Daniel King-Turner
  Tim Smyczek

Champions

Singles

 Michael Russell def.  Grega Žemlja, 6–0, 6–3

Doubles

 Kevin Anderson /  Ryler DeHeart def.  Im Kyu-tae /  Martin Slanar, 3–6, 7–6(7–2), [15–13]

References 

Honolulu Challenger
Tennis tournaments in the United States
ATP Challengers in Hawaii
Honolulu Challenger
Honolulu Challenger
Honolulu Challenger